Jacques Gillot, b. 4 March 1948 in Gosier, on the French Caribbean island of Guadeloupe, was the  President of the General Council of Guadeloupe.  He has been chairing the General Council March 2001 to April 2015. Gillot was elected to the French senate in 2004.

He is also the founding member of the Guadeloupe Unie Socialisme and Réalités ("United Guadeloupe Socialism and Realities") political party. Gillot is a physician, is married and has three children.

References

1948 births
Living people
Guadeloupean socialists
French people of Guadeloupean descent
French Senators of the Fifth Republic
Guadeloupean physicians
Guadeloupean politicians
United Guadeloupe, Solidary and Responsible politicians
La République En Marche! politicians
Senators of Guadeloupe